Sekolah Menengah Kebangsaan St Peter Bundu is a secondary school located in Kuala Penyu, Sabah, Malaysia. It was founded in 1965 by Reverend Father Geest and opened on 7 January 1966.

Kuala Penyu District
Schools in Sabah
Secondary schools in Malaysia